Promeranisa is a genus of flies in the family Stratiomyidae.

Species
Promeranisa cylindricornis Williston, 1888
Promeranisa nasuta (Macquart, 1850)
Promeranisa varipes James, 1979
Promeranisa vittata Walker, 1856

References

Stratiomyidae
Brachycera genera
Taxa named by Francis Walker (entomologist)
Diptera of South America
Diptera of North America